Transgender Awareness Week, observed  November 13 to November 19, is a one-week celebration leading up to the Transgender Day of Remembrance (TDoR), which memorializes victims of transphobic violence. TDoR occurs annually on November 20, when transgender advocates raise awareness of the transgender community through education and advocacy activities.

The first week of November typically begins with third parties hosting events at venues (including online venues) surrounding a main central venue, followed the second week by more venues at the main area showcasing more and more in-depth events. The purpose of Transgender Awareness Week is to educate about transgender and gender non-conforming people and the issues associated with their transition or identity.

History

There have been many pivotal historical moments that relate to transgender advocacy.
1952: Christine Jorgensen is featured in American national media – provided a large number of people with access to information about transgender issues for the first time as she was the first American publicly known to have undergone sex reassignment surgery.
1954: news of the first known British trans woman, Roberta Cowell, broke, gaining public interest around the world.
1964: American trans man Reed Erickson creates the Erickson Educational Foundation – the first foundation to donate millions to promote transgender and gay equality.
1972: Sweden legalizes gender reassignment – the first country to legally allow citizens to change sex.
1975: the Gender Dysphoria Clinic at Queen Victoria Hospital, Melbourne was established by Dr Trudy Kennedy and Dr Herbert Bower. 
1979: the Victorian Transsexual Coalition and the Victorian Transsexual Association is formed, Australia's first transgender rights and advocacy organisations were established.
1979: A Change of Sex, the BBC documentary about male to female transgender person Julia Grant.
1986: Lou Sullivan founds FTM International – the first advocacy group for transgender men; the purpose was to challenge the popular idea that all trans men were lesbians before they transitioned into male.
1998: Rita Hester's murder – murdered on November 28 because of gender identity, a candlelight vigil was held on December 4 to honor Hester's life; death lead to inspiration for the idea of the first International Transgender Day of Remembrance started by trans woman Gwendolyn Ann Smith.
1999: The murder of PFC Barry Winchell for dating a trans-woman Calpernia Addams.
1999: The first observance of International Transgender Day of Remembrance to commemorate victims of anti-transgender hate crimes, observed on November 20.
2002: Transgender Law Center founded – aimed to alter laws and opinions regarding transgender people so they could live a life without discrimination based on gender identity.
2002: Sylvia Rivera Law Project founded – provides legal and educational services and works towards altering policies.
2003: National Center for Transgender Equality founded – founded to progress the equality of transgender people through advocacy, collaboration, and empowerment.
2009: The first observance of International Transgender Day of Visibility - This day was created by Michigan transgender activist Rachel Crandall to serve as a positive counterpart to Transgender Day of Remembrance, it is celebrated living trans people and raises awareness to transgender issues, observed on November 20.
2010: the Australian Defence Force policy was amended to allow transgender Australians to openly serve.
2010: Gender Health Center, Sacramento, California, United States of America opened its doors.
2012: The Equal Employment Opportunity Commission declares transgender people protected against employment discrimination because of violations to Title VII of the Civil Rights Act of 1964.
These are just a few of the many important moments that have led to increased transgender advocacy and awareness.

Events
Participants in Transgender Awareness Week are urged to organize events that serve as educational opportunities to the community. One possible event is the screening of a trans-themed movie, such as the film Paris is Burning, which highlights gay and transgender ball culture in New York City. Another educational event is the personal testimonies of local transgender people and the issues they face because of their gender identity. "I AM: Trans People Speak" is a collection of videos regarding transgender people's personal testimonies that could be shown in place of a live testimony. Other potential events might revolve around the discussion of a trans-themed book or the observation of a trans-themed art show or performance.

In San Francisco, Transgender Awareness Week was expanded to cover the entire month of November starting in 2018 by Mayor London Breed and Clair Farley, director of the city's Office of Transgender Initiatives. In November 2019, each member of the San Francisco Board of Supervisors gave a commendation to a member of the trans community.

Additional information with controversies
A study conducted by the Williams Institute in 2016 concluded that 0.6% of the U.S. population (1.4 million people) identify themselves as transgender. In 2008, only 8% of Americans reported knowing or working with someone who is transgender; by 2015, this had doubled to 16%, according to a Harris poll, and by 2021, this had risen to 42% according to a Pew poll, but it is still far less than the number of Americans who know someone who is gay or lesbian (87%, as of 2013, according to a Pew poll).

Trans people face many issues within their community that causes them to feel like they are in danger and are unsafe. A survey found that 50% of trans people report having been raped or assaulted by a romantic partner. Trans people have been murdered simply for being trans, in addition to their loved ones and/or friends because of being involved with them. Some trans women were arrested for fighting back against their attacker. Trans people and supporters formerly united with one another and took stands against discrimination towards trans people by holding protests. Transgender Awareness Week was established in response to these killings and imprisonments in order to highlight the challenges faced by trans people.

See also 
List of LGBT awareness periods
Transgender flag
Transgender rights movement

References

External links
Transgender Law Center website 
Massachusetts Transgender Political Coalition website

November observances
LGBT events in the United States
Awareness weeks
Transgender events
LGBT awareness periods